Gamblestown is a small village in County Down, Northern Ireland about 1.5 km from Donaghcloney, on the Lurgan to Dromore road. It is situated in the Parish of Magheralin and the townland of Clogher. In the 2001 Census it had a population of 159 people. It is situated to the southeast of the Craigavon Borough Council area.

The village is largely composed of residential development, a church hall and some retail warehousing, but is without other facilities.

References

See also 
List of villages in Northern Ireland

Villages in County Down